This is a partial list of streets or roads in Cebu, Philippines.

Background
Ever since the early American Period in Cebu, street names from former Spanish colonial leaders were renamed, mostly at that time, after revolutionaries who were either executed or died while fighting the Spaniards or the Americans. Some streets were named after famous Filipino leaders, and as well as the first elected leaders of a certain area, town, barangay or a city. Cebu also boasts street names named after philanthropists, common civilian jobs like teachers, civic leaders, priests and exemplary government officials. Rarely, streets in Cebu are named after foreigners, but if it was, it was done in commemoration of either heroic deeds, or help in the development of the island and even played a part in the Philippine history.

Majority of the common streets in Cebu were already present during the Spanish Era, but many more alleyways were constructed as the years passed by (in conjunction with the growth and expansion of Cebu), thus giving rise to the naming of numerous streets in Cebu.

The unique planning of such engineering feat, is reflected today in the city, as streets are easy to locate and trek, rather than in Metropolitan Manila, where the streets just pass by and intersect even if the area is too small or overcrowded.

This street listing solely focuses on the key Cities within the Island of Cebu.

Bogo

Cebu City

Danao

Lapu-Lapu

Mandaue

City of Naga

Talisay

Toledo

References

Streets in Cebu
Cebu City-related lists
Streets in Cebu
Cebu
Cebu